Tystion (English: Witnesses) was a Welsh language hip hop band from Wales.

Background 
In 1996, MC Sleifar (Steffan Cravos) and G Man (Gruff Meredith) got together and released a few cassettes themselves. A year later they released the album Rhaid i Rhywbeth Ddigwydd (Something's Got to Happen), recorded with future Murry The Hump member Curig Huws, on their own Fitamin Un label.  This caught the eye of Ankstmusik who then released their second album Shrug Off Ya Complex in 1999.

Meredith then left the band to become MC Mabon.  Cravos was then joined by fellow rapper MC Chef (Gareth Williams) and Clancy Pegg on bass and keyboards.  Their third album Hen Gelwydd Prydain Newydd (New Britain's Old Lie) was released in 2000 on Fitamin Un.

The band announced their split in August 2002. The announcement was made by Steffan Cravos from the stage of Maes B at the National Eisteddfod in St David's, at what was to be their last gig.

Discography

Albums

Singles

References

External links
 Biographical Details (with translation of lyrics)

Welsh-language bands
Welsh hip hop groups